Arnold Haley (1942–2003) was an international speedway rider from England and Great Britain.

Speedway career 
Haley rode in the top tier of British Speedway from 1965-1981, riding for various clubs. He was capped by England 33 times and Great Britain 6 times. He reached the final of the British Speedway Championship on four occasions in 1969, 1970, 1971 and 1972.

References 

1942 births
2003 deaths
British speedway riders
Belle Vue Aces riders
Cradley Heathens riders
Edinburgh Monarchs riders
Exeter Falcons riders
Oxford Cheetahs riders
Sheffield Tigers riders
Workington Comets riders
Sportspeople from Leeds